The Government of Eastern Equatoria from 2005 to 2010 took office in Eastern Equatoria State of South Sudan after a peace treaty was signed between the Sudan People's Liberation Movement and the government of Sudan based in Khartoum.  Elections were originally planned for 2009, but were postponed until April 2010.

State government

The State Government, headed by Governor  was appointed by the President.

Advisers to the Governor

 Security Affairs – Mr. Marcello Otwari Dominic
 Administration Affairs – Angelo Vugga
 Political Affairs – Dr. Robert Lokamu
 Human Rights – Agnes Lox Nedo

Ministries

Interim Legislative Assembly

Speaker of State Assembly – Sabina Dario Lokolong (SPLM)
Deputy Speaker – Martin Odwar Lonuha (SPLM)
Leader of Government Business – Paul Napwon Yonai

Representatives

 Sabina Dario Lokolong (SPLM) – Budi County
 Martin Odwar Lonuha (SPLM) – Ikotos County
 Paul Napwon Yonai (SPLM) – Kapoeta South
 Arungogle Rino Loremo (SPLM) – Budi County
 Jamal Peter Lotipe (SSDF) – Kapoeta North County
 Julius Ajeo Moilinga (SPLM) – Magwi County
 Agnes Florence Odwar – Torit County
 Paul Okot Bara (SANU) – Magwi County
 Oromo Baranaba Ekol (SPLM) – Lafon County
 Karlo Lopuke Amoni (SPLM) – Kapoeta East County
 Mark Uttor Owitti (NCP) – Lafon County
 Aziz Atari Aziz (SPLM) – Ikotos County
 Josephine Thomas (SPLM) – Torit County
 Vitale Aburi Lomiluk (USAP 1 ) – Magwi County
 Fermo Peter Issara (NCP) – Torit County
 Osfald Tafeng (USAP 2) – Torit County
 Dominic Otwari Theodore (USAP 2) – Torit County
 Patrick Bafura Paul (FORUM)
 Arnold Hatulang
 Mark Taban
 Charles Rino Atul (SSDF) – Budi County
 Martin Lopir Lotubai (SPLM) – Kapoeta South County
 Alma Maha Thomas
 Emmanuel Ambrose Ocholimoi (SPLM) – Torit County
 Urbano Oyet Jobojobo (SPLM) – Magwi County
 Elizabeth Idor James (SPLM) – Lopa/Lafon County
 Semira Louis Lojore (SPLM) – Kapoeta South County
 Joseph Celepus Lonok (NCP) – Kapoeta North County
 Offis Asada Otome (SPLM) – Torit County
 Hakim Iko (SPLM) – Kapoeta North County
 Robert Lochan Ngiroluk (SPLM) – Kapoeta North County
 Benjamin Lopeyok (SPLM) – Kapoeta East County
 Irene Peter Paul (SPLM) – Kapoeta South County
 Ohisa Affwoni Lais (SANU) – Torit County
 Abel Uchan Idris (SPLM) – Lafon/ Lopa County
 Jeremy K. Africa (SPLM) – Ikotos County
 Marko Lokitoe Lokuuta (SPLM) – Kapoeta South County
 Martin Milla – Magwi County
 Cypriano Lonyangatom (SPLM) – Kapoeta East County
 Christine Nakwar Patrick (SPLM) – Kapoeta East County
 Clement Otto Kulo – Magwi County
 Peter Bosco Lotyang (SPLM) – Budi County
 Perina Laweno (NCP) – Magwi County
 Marko Mustafa Lotinomoi (NCP) – Budi County

Business Committees

Directorate of Contracts, Legal Aid, Human Rights Conventions and Treaties

 Director – Paul Mayak Marrier
 Deputy Director – Majok Dau Kuot
 Third Legal Counsellor – Chol Awow Lual
 Legal Counsellor – Machar Ader Ader Nyong
 Legal Counsellor – Chan Jarico Tuong Nyibong
 Legal Counsellor – Marko Bol Deng
 Legal Counsellor – Akol Deng Back Deng
 Legal Counsellor – Biu Lat Mading

See also
Government of Eastern Equatoria from 2010

References

Eastern Equatoria
Government of South Sudan